This partial list of city nicknames in Kentucky compiles the aliases, sobriquets and slogans that cities and towns in Kentucky are known by (or have been known by historically), officially and unofficially, to municipal governments, local people, outsiders or their tourism boards or chambers of commerce. City nicknames can help in establishing a civic identity, helping outsiders recognize a community or attracting people to a community because of its nickname; promote civic pride; and build community unity. Nicknames and slogans that successfully create a new community "ideology or myth" are also believed to have economic value. Their economic value is difficult to measure, but there are anecdotal reports of cities that have achieved substantial economic benefits by "branding" themselves by adopting new slogans.

Some unofficial nicknames are positive, while others are derisive. The unofficial nicknames listed here have been in use for a long time or have gained wide currency.
Bardstown – Bourbon Capital of the World
Bellevue - B-town
Benham – The Little Town That International Harvester, Coal Miners, and Their Families Built
Berea – Folk Arts and Crafts Capital of Kentucky
Bowling Green
Vette City
The Park City
Burnside – The Only Town on Lake Cumberland
Cave City – Gateway to Mammoth Cave
Covington – Gateway to the South
 Crestwood – Whiskers
Danville – City of Firsts
Elizabethtown – E Town 
Elkhorn City – Gateway to the Breaks
Fort Thomas – The City of Beautiful Homes
Grayson – Heart of the Parks
Hazard – Queen City of the Mountains
Hopkinsville – Hoptown
Hyden – Redbud Capital of the World
Lexington
Athens of the West
Horse Capital of the WorldVisit Lexington, Kentucky, accessed April 7, 2007. "Visiting a horse farm while you're in the Horse Capital of the World is a uniquely Bluegrass kind of experience you'll long remember."
Louisville
 City of Beautiful Churches 
Derby CityLouisville Historic Tours, Historic Old Louisville Visitors Center website, accessed June 27, 2010
The Fall City (reported in the 1880s) or Falls City
Gateway to the South
River CityParking Authority of River City. Retrieved 2008-02-14.
The Ville
Madisonville – Best Town on Earth.
Manchester – City of Hope
Mayfield – Pearl of the Purchase
Middlesboro
The Athens of the Mountains
The City Built Inside a Meteorite Crater
Crater City
Little Las Vegas
The Magic City
Monticello – Houseboat Capital of the World
Mt.Sterling – Gateway Between the Bluegrass and the Mountains 
Owensboro – Barbecued Mutton Capital of the World
Paducah – Quilt City
Paintsville – The City Between the Lakes
Paris – Thoroughbred Capital of the World
Pikeville – The City That Moves Mountains
Prestonsburg – The Star City of Eastern Kentucky
Renfro Valley – Kentucky's Country Music Capital
Shelbyville – The Gateway to the Bluegrass
Simpsonville – American Saddlebred Capital of the World
Somerset 
Car Cruise Capital of Kentucky 
Spirit of Southern Kentucky
Williamsburg – Your Gateway to the Cumberlands

See also
List of city nicknames in the United States
List of cities in Kentucky

References

External links
a list of American and a few Canadian nicknames
U.S. cities list

Kentucky cities
Populated places in Kentucky
Kentucky culture
City nicknames